this is a list of Croatian football transfers for summer 2015, only the Croatian First Football League is included

Croatian First Football League

Dinamo Zagreb

In:

Out:

Hajduk Split

In:

Out:

Inter Zaprešić

In:

Out:

NK Istra 1961

In:

Out:

NK Lokomotiva

In:

Out:

NK Zagreb

In:

Out:

NK Osijek

In:

Out:

HNK Rijeka

In:

Out

RNK Split

In:

 

Out:

NK Slaven Belupo

In:

Out:

References

Croatia
Transfers
Transfers
2015